The 15431544 Pachecos entrada was the final military campaign in the Spanish conquest of Yucatan, which brought three Postclassic Mayan states and several Amerindian settlements in the southeastern quarter of the Yucatan peninsula under the jurisdiction of Salamanca de Bacalar, a villa of colonial Yucatan, in New Spain. It is commonly deemed one of (if not the) bloodiest and cruelest entradas in the peninsula's conquest, resulting in the deaths of hundreds or thousands, and the displacement of tens of thousands, of Mayan residents.

Prelude 

The settlers of colonial Cuba were the first Spaniards to turn their attention to the conquest of Mayan states in the Yucatan peninsula. They were enticed to conquer these after the 1517 Hernández de Córdoba expedition brought news of splendid (and presumably gold-rich) pre-Columbian cities. The Cubans were soon engrossed in the conquest of the Aztec Empire, however, leaving the peninsula's subjugation for later.

Conquest began in earnest upon Francisco de Montejo's naming as adelantado on 8 November 1526. Montejo's first entrada of 15271528 focussed on the eastern provinces, including Uaymil and Chetumal. This campaign did not result in Spanish victory, though, requiring a further 15311533 entrada, which was similarly unsuccessful.

By early 1544, the western, northern, and northeastern Mayan provinces had been defeated, and replaced with the municipios or districts of Campeche, Merida, and Valladolid. This left only the southeastern provinces (Uaymil, Chetumal, and Dzuluinicob) up for conquest.

Entrada

Northern prong 

In April 1543, the second adelantado of Yucatan commissioned Gaspar Pacheco his lieutenant governor, captain general, and justicia mayor for the conquest of Chetumal, Uaymil, and Amerindian settlements on the Golfo Dulce. Pacheco recruited 25 to 30 vecinos of Merida for the campaign, naming his son, Melchor, second-in-command, and his nephew, Alonso, third-in-command.

The party set out of Merida in late 1543 or early 1544. In (recently-conquered) Cochuah, Pacheco compelled war-stricken residents to supply his men with burden-bearers, servants, and provisions, thereby reducing that province to famine. Upon entering Uaymil, Pacheco 'began one of the bloodiest campaigns, and certainly the cruelest, of the entire conquest [of Yucatan].' Here, the lieutenant governor was stricken ill, forcing his retreat to Merida, and transfer of the entrada'''s command to his son, Melchor.

The entrada was not well-received at Uaymil nor Chetumal. Residents, determined on guerilla warfare, had destroyed their farmland, blocked the thoroughfares, and deserted their settlements. The scarcity of food was a strain on both sides, however, as both Spaniards and Mayans were forced to forage for sustenance, quickly leading to a war of attrition. Facing famine, the Pachecos 'deliberately resorted to wanton acts of cruelty of a kind of which the Montejos and their other principal captains were seldom, if ever guilty.' These acts included–
 killing 'many' or 'numbers' of men and women with the garrote,
 drowning them in lakes,
 sicking dogs of war on non-combatants until they were dead and their corpses mutilated,
 severing the hands, ears, and noses of 'many' residents or combatants,
 severing the breasts of women, tying gourds to their feet, and drowning them in lagoons,
 tying prisoners to stakes, then (non-fatally) whipping them and (non-fatally) shooting arrows at them, until they died of 'natural' causes.

These tactics, or attrition itself, 'finally brought the Maya of Uaymil-Chetumal to their knees and the Spaniards to mastery of the province' in 1544. At this point, Melchor Pacheco founded Salamanca de Bacalar, appointing its cabildo, designating its twenty vecinos, and allotting settlements of the conquered provinces in encomienda.

 Southern prong 

In 1544, the Pachecos pushed southwards through Dzuluinicob and Manche Ch'ol and Mopan territory towards the Golfo Dulce.

 Aftermath 
 Population collapse 

It is generally agreed that the Pachecos' victory soon proved pyrrhic. Uaymil and Chetumal, in particular, were said to be heavily populated, wealthy provinces prior to conquest. The district Salamanca de Bacalar inherited, however, was sparsely settled and poor, and remained so throughout.

 Dominican opposition 
Shortly after 1544, Dominican friars (including Bartolome de las Casas), who claimed jurisdiction to the Golfo Dulce (as did the adelantado), protested the Pachecos' southern entrada. Eventually, the Spanish Crown and Real Audiencia de los Confines ruled in favour of the friars, definitively barring non-Dominicans from settling in the gulf. This brought the Pachecos' efforts in the region (and the adelantados wishes to conquer it) to nought.

 Criminal prosecution 

Upon learning of the Pachecos' 'wanton cruelties', Spanish laymen and Franciscan friars petitioned the Crown for their prosecution (sometime during 15451549).

On 1 June 1549, Villalobos, promotor fiscal of the Consejo Real de Indias, criminally charged the Pachecos– Consequently, Villalobos awarded surviving relatives of the Pachecos' victims with 100,000 castellanos de oro in compensation, to be paid by the Pachecos. In addition, the Spanish Crown confiscated Melchor's encomienda in the Bacalar district.

 Legacy 

The Pachecos entrada is widely deemed one of (if not the'') bloodiest and cruelest campaigns of the Spanish conquest of Yucatan.

On 10 February 1548, Lorenzo de Bienvenida, a Franciscan friar, reported to the Spanish Crown–

Notes

Citations

References 

 
 
 
 
 
 
 
 
 
 
 
 
 
 
 
 
 
 
 
 
 
 
 
 
 
 
 

Spanish conquests in the Americas
1540s in New Spain
1540s conflicts
Wars involving Spain
Wars involving Mexico
Wars involving Belize
Wars involving Guatemala
16th century in Belize
16th century in Guatemala
History of the Yucatán Peninsula
16th century in the Maya civilization